The Achilles Painter  was a vase-painter active ca. 470–425 BC. His name vase is an amphora, Vatican 16571, in the Vatican museums depicting Achilles and dated 450–445 BC. An armed and armored Achilles gazes pensively to the right with one hand on his hip. The other hand holds a spear. On the opposite surface a woman performs libation.

J. D. Beazley attributed over 200 vases to his hand, the largest share being red-figure and white-ground lekythoi.  In his middle phase (ca. 450–445 BC), he decorates more open forms. The Achilles Painter was a late pupil of the Berlin Painter.

The Phiale Painter became the Achilles Painter's most prominent student after he assumed the Berlin Painter's workshop. Almost a dozen other recognizable painters passed through the Achilles Painter's workshop as well. Notable painters include the Westreenen Painter, the Persephone Painter, the Clio Painter, Loeb Painter, and the Dwarf Painter. The Kleophon Painter, the Sabouroff Painter, and the Painter of Munich 2335 all spent time at the workshop as well.

Appraisal

Beazley describes him thus:
He is the great master of the white lekythos.  His red-figure vases nearly always have a sober beauty, but few of them–like the pointed amphora in the Cabinet des Médailles–reach the height of his best white lekythoi, which are among the masterpieces of ancient drawing.

In 1962, Greece issued a stamp featuring the decoration of an Achilles Painter white-ground lekythos.

Findspots

 Acropolis, Athens
 Ceramicus, Athens
 Capua, Italy
 Pisticci, Italy
 Taranto, Italy
 Vulci, Italy
 Selinis, Sicily
 Enna, Sicily
 Attica
 Eretria
 Euboea

References

Further reading

External links

Works at the Metropolitan Museum of Art
Name vase at the Beazley Archive
Artcyclopedia - The Achilles Painter

Year of birth unknown
5th-century BC deaths
Ancient Greek vase painters
Anonymous artists of antiquity
5th-century BC Greek people